Charles Macleod-Robertson (7 May 1870 – 2 July 1951) was British sailing competitor at the 1908 Summer Olympics. Sources also give his name as Colin McLeod Robertson.

He was a crew member on the Mouchette which finished second of two teams competing in the 12 metre class. At the time, only the helmsman and mate were awarded silver medals, while the crew received bronze medals. However, Macleod-Robertson is credited as having received a silver medal in the official Olympic database.

References

External links
 
 

1870 births
1951 deaths
British male sailors (sport)
Olympic sailors of Great Britain
Olympic silver medallists for Great Britain
Olympic medalists in sailing
Medalists at the 1908 Summer Olympics
Sailors at the 1908 Summer Olympics – 12 Metre